Novopokrovka is a rural locality (a selo) in Kasatkinsky Selsoviet of Arkharinsky District, Amur Oblast, Russia. The population was 77 as of 2018. There are 3 streets.

Geography 
Novopokrovka is located on the left bank of the Amur River, 79 km south of Arkhara (the district's administrative centre) by road. Kasatkino is the nearest rural locality.

References 

Rural localities in Arkharinsky District